The Essjay controversy was an incident in which Ryan Jordan, a Wikipedia editor who went by the username "Essjay", falsely presented himself as a university professor of religion from 2005 to 2007, during which time he was elected to top positions of trust by the community, including administrator and arbitrator. In July 2006, The New Yorker published an article about "Essjay", and mentioned that he was a university professor of religion. The New Yorker later acknowledged that they did not know his real name. The controversy came to involve Wikipedia co-founder Jimmy Wales who, after initially defending Jordan, eventually asked for his resignation in March 2007. Jordan was eventually shown to have lied about his credentials, which he occasionally used as an argument to gain an upper hand in some discussions. The incident led to a critique of anonymity on Wikipedia, and a distrust of self-professed, anonymous experts among the Wikipedia community.

Overview 

On July 26, 2006, Wikipedia critic Daniel Brandt started a thread on the unaffiliated discussion site Wikipedia Review titled "Who is Essjay?" (later retitled "Who is Essjay?, Probably he's Ryan Jordan" after Jordan's self-disclosure). Essjay had stated on his Wikipedia user page that he taught graduate theology at a private university, and had doctorates in theology and canon law. The ensuing discussion brought to light contradictions in Essjay's claims about his academic qualifications and professional experiences.

Five days later, The New Yorker published an interview with Essjay which repeated some of the false claims on his user page.

In January 2007, Brandt contacted the author of the article in The New Yorker about the discrepancies in Jordan's biography and the exploitation of his supposed qualifications as leverage in internal disputes over Wikipedia content.

The controversy that ensued focused on his falsification of a persona and qualifications, the impact of this deception on perceptions of Wikipedia (and its policies and credibility), and the quality of decisions made in his promotion, support, and employment.

Reactions to the disclosure were diverse, encompassing commentary and articles in electronic, print, and broadcast media. The Wikipedia community researched Essjay's article edits to check for errors, and debated proposals to improve the project's handling of personal identification. During this time, Jordan spent less time editing the content of articles and more time addressing vandalism and resolving editorial disputes.

Wikipedia co-founder Jimmy Wales initially supported Essjay's use of a persona, saying, "I regard it as a pseudonym and I don't really have a problem with it." Later, around March 5, 2007, Wales withdrew his support and asked for Essjay's resignation from his positions with Wikipedia and Wikia. Wales stated that he withdrew his support when he learned that "Essjay used his false credentials in content disputes" on Wikipedia.

The New Yorker interview
Stacy Schiff, a Pulitzer Prize-winning journalist writing for The New Yorker, interviewed Essjay as a source for an article about Wikipedia ("Know It All"; July 31, 2006) after he was recommended to her by a member of the Wikimedia Foundation. According to The New Yorker, Essjay "was willing to describe his work as a Wikipedia administrator but would not identify himself other than by confirming the biographical details that appeared on his user page."

During the interview, Jordan told The New Yorker and had previously stated on his Wikipedia user page that he held doctoral degrees in theology and canon law and worked as a tenured professor at a private university. It was later discovered that he was 24 years old, and had dropped out of community college with no qualifications. The New Yorker published a correction in February 2007, which brought the issue to broader public attention.

The article said that Essjay spent some 14 hours or more a day on Wikipedia but was careful to keep his online life a secret from his colleagues and friends. It portrayed Essjay as often taking his laptop to class so he could be available to other Wikipedians while giving a quiz. He asserted that he required anonymity to avoid cyberstalking.

Jordan, as Essjay, claimed he sent an email to a college professor using his invented persona's credentials, vouching for Wikipedia's accuracy. In the message he wrote in part, "I am an administrator of the online encyclopedia project Wikipedia. I am also a tenured professor of theology; feel free to have a look at my Wikipedia user page (linked below) to gain an idea of my background and credentials."

Identity revealed
When Essjay was hired by Wikia in January 2007, he changed his Wikia profile and "came clean on who he really was", identifying himself as Ryan Jordan. Other Wikipedia editors questioned Essjay on his Wikipedia talk page about the apparent discrepancy between his new Wikia profile and his previously claimed credentials. Essjay posted a detailed explanation in response to the first inquiry, stating that:

He later commented on his Wikipedia user page about having fooled Schiff by "... doing a good job playing the part."

Wikipedia critic Daniel Brandt then wrote a letter reporting the identity discrepancy to Stacy Schiff and The New Yorker. In late February 2007, the magazine updated its article with a correction indicating that "Essjay now says that his real name is Ryan Jordan, that he is twenty-four and holds no advanced degrees, and that he has never taught."

On February 23, 2007, Jimmy Wales announced the appointment of Essjay to Wikipedia's Arbitration Committee. Wales later asserted that the appointment was "at the request of and unanimous support of" the Arbitration Committee.

On March 3, 2007, Andrew Lih, Assistant Professor and Director of Technology Journalism and of the Media Studies Centre at the University of Hong Kong, said on his blog that a portion of Essjay's comments on the incident entered "the dangerous domain of defamation and libel" against Stacy Schiff. Lih stated that on Essjay's Wikipedia talk page, Essjay had written, "Further, she [Schiff] made several offers to compensate me for my time, and my response was that if she truly felt the need to do so, she should donate to the Foundation instead." Lih noted:

Lih wrote that he contacted Schiff for comment about whether she had offered to pay Essjay for his time and quoted her return email. In it, Schiff stated that Essjay's assertion was "complete nonsense".

On March 6, 2007, Jordan's hometown newspaper published an article casting doubts about his January 2007 claims on his Wikia userpage that he had worked for the United States Trustee Program and had been a Kentucky paralegal. On March 12, 2007, The New Yorker published a formal apology by Wales in its March 19 The Mail section.

Reaction

Wikipedia community
Speaking personally about Jordan, Wales said, "Mr. Ryan was a friend, and still is a friend. He is a young man, and he has offered me a heartfelt personal apology, which I have accepted. I hope the world will let him go in peace to build an honorable life and reputation."

Essjay had responded at the time with a statement on his Wikipedia page, in part reading:

Reaction from within the Wikipedia community to the Essjay/Jordan identity discrepancy was sharp, voluminous, and mixed. While most editors denounced at least some of his actions, responses ranged from offering complete support to accusing Jordan of fraud.

As the controversy unfolded, the Wikipedia community began a review of Essjay's previous edits and some felt he had relied upon his fictional professorship to influence editorial consideration of edits he made. "People have gone through his edits and found places where he was basically cashing in on his fake credentials to bolster his arguments", said Michael Snow, a Wikipedia administrator and founder of the Wikipedia community newspaper, the Signpost. "Those will get looked at again." For instance, Essjay had recommended sources such as Catholicism for Dummies, a book granted the nihil obstat and imprimatur by the Roman Catholic Church. Essjay defended his use of the book by telling fellow Wikipedia editors in a disagreement over the editing of the article Imprimatur: "This is a text I often require for my students, and I would hang my own Ph.D. on  credibility." In another case (a discussion of the liturgical use of the psalms), he cited personal experience from "the Abbey of Gethsemani, where I was a monk."

Jimmy Wales proposed a credential verification system on Wikipedia following the Essjay controversy, but the proposal was rejected. Wales was "reported to be considering vetting all persons who adjudicate on factual disputes." "I don't think this incident exposes any inherent weakness in Wikipedia, but it does expose a weakness that we will be working to address", Wales added. He insisted that Wikipedia editors still would be able to remain anonymous if they wished. "We always prefer to give a positive incentive rather than absolute prohibition, so that people can contribute without a lot of hassle", Wales commented. However, he also warned that "It's always inappropriate to try to win an argument by flashing your credentials, and even more so if those credentials are inaccurate." However, Florence Devouard, chair of the Wikimedia Foundation, was not supportive of his credential proposal, saying, "I think what matters is the quality of the content, which we can improve by enforcing policies such as 'cite your source,' not the quality of credentials showed by an editor." A formal proposal that users claiming to have academic qualifications would need to provide evidence before citing them in content disputes was eventually rejected by the Wikipedia community, like all previous such proposals.

As a follow-up to his initial comments to The New Yorker, Wales wrote this apology to the magazine, which appeared in its March 19, 2007 issue:

Wales acknowledged that the controversy hurt the site’s credibility, noting "people do need to be aware of how [Wikipedia] is created and edited so they can treat it with the appropriate caution." He expressed his regret that Essjay had "made a series of very bad judgments." He also commented that he hoped Wikipedia would improve as a result of the controversy.

Wikipedia commenters

Andrew Orlowski, a frequent Wikipedia critic and writer for The Register—a British technology news and opinion website—criticized Jimmy Wales for hiring Essjay at the venture-capital-funded Wikia and for appointing him to the Wikipedia Arbitration Committee after Essjay had apparently admitted his previously claimed academic and professional credentials were false. Orlowski added that Essjay's actions betrayed a dangerous community mindset within Wikipedia.

Others to comment negatively included ZDNet writer Mitch Ratcliffe, who asked "why lying about one's background qualifies a person to work for a company like Wikia, which proposes to help communities to record accurate information" and asked for additional details "such as when he fired Jordan and the reasons for the firing, as well as when he endorsed Jordan in public statements."

Larry Sanger, co-founder of Wikipedia who left the project in 2002, called Essjay's response "a defiant non-apology" and elsewhere characterized Essjay's actions as "identity fraud".

Other comments:
 BusinessWeek commented on proposals for credential verification: "Sadly, not everyone who posts to Wikipedia is concerned with the Ten Commandments. Some are concerned with revenge. Some with self-aggrandizement. Some just have nothing better to do. We live in an age of fake IDs, fake money, fake e-mails, fake URLs, fake IP addresses, and fake votes..." However, the article argued that Wikipedia could not become a "net police" of reliability on the Internet.
 Steve Maich, a journalist at Maclean's, stated that the controversy could damage Wikipedia's future as a media business operation, observing that Wikipedia's model was supposedly built upon trust and credibility.
 Cassandra Jardine, a Daily Telegraph contributor, opined that Essjay was "hooked on 'Wiki crack'—devotees' jargon for the thrill of seeing your efforts debated." She further observed that "Essjay has provided a reminder that any given entry could have been written by someone as ignorant as ourselves. On the other hand, no one has taken issue with his edits, only his assumed persona, so perhaps the real lesson of this democratic medium is that college drop-outs might be as authoritative as professors."
 Andrew Keen (author, Cult of the Amateur) described the controversy as an example of ignoring expert guidance in favor of the "dictatorship of idiots."
 Alex Beam (columnist, The Boston Globe) criticized the Essjay affair as being part of what he characterizes as the problems of "crowdsourcing" and the "wisdom of crowds" stating also that the crowd accepts authority unquestioningly: "Who would you rather have write your encyclopedia entries? Bertrand Russell, T.H. Huxley, and Benedetto Croce, who wrote for the Britannica? Or ... EssJay?"

Academics
Following the media coverage of the Essjay controversy, a number of academics noted the damage to the credibility of Wikipedia. On March2, 2007, a report in The Chronicle of Higher Education commented "the incident is clearly damaging to Wikipedia's credibility—especially with professors who will now note that one of the site's most visible academics has turned out to be a fraud." Ross Brann, a professor of Judeo-Islamic studies at Cornell University in Ithaca, stated that Wikipedia lacks a process of scholarly review, saying, "They could make up your life if they wanted to." Brann also said that Wikipedia "has no place in the University", and he believed the Essjay incident would do nothing to change the unfavorable opinion that academics generally hold about the online encyclopedia.

Media scholar Axel Bruns stated that while what Essjay did was "clearly deceptive and unethical" the controversy "does not undermine the Wikipedia model."

Nicola Pratt, a lecturer in international relations at the University of East Anglia in England, stated, "The ethos of Wikipedia is that anyone can contribute, regardless of status... What's relevant is their knowledge as judged by other readers, not whether they are professors or not—and the fact the student [Essjay] was exposed shows it works." In 2009, a lengthy article was published by the National Council of Teachers of English discussing the challenges of determining textual origins in college compositions, using a detailed history of the Essjay incident to set the context.

See also

 Reliability of Wikipedia
 List of Wikipedia controversies
 On the Internet, nobody knows you're a dog
 Argument from authority

References

Notes

Sources

External links

History of Wikipedia
Impostors
Internet hoaxes
2006 scandals
2007 scandals
People who fabricated academic degrees
Wikipedia controversies